André Hugon (17 December 1886 – 22 August 1960) was a French film director, screenwriter and film producer best known for his silent films from 1913 onwards, particularly of the 1920s and into sound.

Hugon was born in Algiers in 1886 which at the time was part of France. He directed some 90 films between 1913 and 1952.

Selected filmography
 Flower of Paris (1916)
 The Gold Chignon (1916)
 The Jackals (1917)
 Anguish (1917)
 Vertigo (1917)
 Sharks (1917)
 A Crime Has Been Committed (1919)
 Mademoiselle Chiffon (1919)
 Jacques Landauze (1920)
 Worthless Woman (1921)
 The Fugitive (1920)
 The Black Diamond (1922)
 The Two Pigeons (1922)
 The Little Thing (1923)
 La gitanilla (1924)
 The Thruster (1924)
 The Princess and the Clown (1924)
 Yasmina (1927)
 The Temple of Shadows (1927)
 The Great Passion (1928)
 The Three Masks (1929)
 The Wedding March (1929)
 Levy and Company (1930)
 Tenderness (1930)
 Moritz Makes his Fortune (1931)
 The Levy Department Stores (1932)
 Southern Cross (1932)
 Maurin of the Moors (1932)
 If You Wish It (1932)
 Mercadet (1936)
 The Marriages of Mademoiselle Levy (1936)
 Sarati the Terrible (1937)
 Street Without Joy (1938)
 Father Serge (1945)
 The Village of Wrath (1947)

External links 

French film directors
Algerian film directors
Silent film directors
French male screenwriters
20th-century French screenwriters
French film producers
People from Algiers
1886 births
1960 deaths
Pieds-Noirs
Burials at Batignolles Cemetery
20th-century French male writers
Migrants from French Algeria to France